Hosiea is a genus of flowering plants belonging to the family Icacinaceae.

It is native to southern China and Japan.

The genus name of Hosiea is in honour of Alexander Hosie (1853–1925), an English diplomat, researcher and plant collector in China, and it was first described and published in Bull. Misc. Inform. Kew 1906 on page 154 in 1906.

Known species, according to Kew:
Hosiea japonica 
Hosiea sinensis

References

Icacinaceae
Asterid genera
Plants described in 1906
Flora of China
Flora of Japan